Ophiodermatidae are a family of brittle stars in the suborder Ophiurina.

Systematics and phylogeny
Some fossils date as far back as the Changhsingian age, late in the Permian period. The family includes the following living genera:
 Bathypectinura
 Cryptopelta
 Diopederma
 Distichophis
 Ophiarachna
 Ophiarachnella
 Ophiochaeta
 Ophiochasma
 Ophioclastus
 Ophioconis
 Ophioconus (accepted as Ophioconis)
 Ophiocormus
 Ophiocryptus
 Ophioderma
 Ophiodyscrita
 Ophioncus
 Ophiopaepale
 Ophiopeza
 Ophiopezella (accepted as Ophiopeza)
 Ophiopinax
 Ophiopsammus
 Ophiostegastus
 Ophiurochaeta
 Pectinura
 Schizoderma
 Toporkovia (accepted as Ophiolimna)

References

Ophiurida
Lopingian first appearances
Extant Permian first appearances